RKAVV is a football club from Leidschendam, Netherlands. RKAVV is playing in the Sunday Hoofdklasse A (4th tier).

Edwin Vurens played for RKAVV. He is the only RKAVV player to have made an appearance for the Netherlands national football team.

References

External links
 Official site

Football clubs in the Netherlands
Football clubs in South Holland
1922 establishments in the Netherlands
Association football clubs established in 1922
Sport in Leidschendam-Voorburg